Entering service in 1915, the Rumpler C.I, (company designation 5A 2), two-seater single-engine reconnaissance biplane, was one of the first German C-type aircraft, and also one of the longest serving in its class during World War I, being retired from the last front line units only in early 1918.

Design and development
The C.I was a successful design, and it was used on Western and Eastern Fronts, Macedonia, Salonika and Palestine. Early production examples were armed only with a single Parabellum machine gun on a Schneider ring mounting, but later aircraft had additionally a synchronised Spandau gun on the port side of fuselage. When used as a light bomber the C.I could also carry 100 kg of bombs.

In addition to the parent company, the Bayerische Rumpler-Werke, the Rumpler C.I was also produced by the Germania Flugzeug-Werke, the Märkische Flugzeug-Werke, the Hannoversche Waggonfabrik and the Albert Rinne Flugzeug-Werke. Variants included the C.Ia, which used a 180 hp Argus As.III engine instead of Mercedes D.III, the C.II, of which there's no evidence that any were actually built,  6B 1 single-seat floatplane fighter, and a Rumpler-built batch of C.Is intended for training which omitted the gun ring in the rear cockpit and was powered by a 150 hp Benz Bz.III.

It was this training role in which the C.I was latterly used, its friendly handling qualities making it suitable to be flown even by inexperienced pilots.

Operators
 
 Luftstreitkrafte

 Latvian Air Force - Postwar.

 Lithuanian Air Force - Postwar. 3 aircraft (No. 2699, 4936, 8144) purchased in 1919.
 
 Polish Air Force - Postwar.
 
 Ottoman Air Force
 
 Royal Yugoslav Air Force - Postwar.

Specifications (C.I)

See also

References

Further reading

1910s German military reconnaissance aircraft
Military aircraft of World War I
Biplanes
C.I
Single-engined tractor aircraft
Aircraft first flown in 1915